The Liaohe oil field is an oil field located in Liaoning Province (Bohai Basin), China. It was discovered in 1958 and developed by China National Petroleum Corporation. It began production in 1970 and produces oil. Production peaked in 1995.

References

Oil fields in China
Geology of Liaoning
Geography of Liaoning